The Angolan Football Federation is the governing body of football in Angola. It was founded in 1979, and affiliated to FIFA and to CAF in 1980. It organizes the national football league Girabola and the national team.

Angola's first appearance in the FIFA World Cup was in 2006; playing in Group D, losing only 1-0 to Portugal in their first match.  Later that year, they successfully bid for the right to host the 2010 African Cup of Nations.

See also 
 Girabola
 Gira Angola
 Federação Angolana de Basquetebol
 Federação Angolana de Andebol

References

External links 

 Official site
 Angola at the FIFA website.
 Angola at CAFONLINE.
 Índice de Comunicados (Portuguese)

Sports governing bodies in Angola
Angola
Football in Angola
Sports organizations established in 1979